An outboard motor is a propulsion system for boats, consisting of a self-contained unit that includes engine, gearbox and propeller or jet drive, designed to be affixed to the outside of the transom. They are the most common motorised method of propelling small watercraft. As well as providing propulsion, outboards provide steering control, as they are designed to pivot over their mountings and thus control the direction of thrust. The skeg also acts as a rudder when the engine is not running. Unlike inboard motors, outboard motors can be easily removed for storage or repairs.

In order to eliminate the chances of hitting bottom with an outboard motor, the motor can be tilted up to an elevated position either electronically or manually. This helps when traveling through shallow waters where there may be debris that could potentially damage the motor as well as the propeller. If the electric motor required to move the pistons which raise or lower the engine is malfunctioning, every outboard motor is equipped with a manual piston release which will allow the operator to drop the motor down to its lowest setting.

General use

Large outboards
Large outboards affixed to the transom using clamps and are either tiller steer up to approx 100 hp. Generally 100 hp plus is linked to controls at the helm.

Portable
Small outboard motors, up to 15 horsepower or so are easily portable. They are affixed to the boat via clamps and thus easily moved from boat to boat. These motors typically use a manual start system, with throttle and gearshift controls mounted on the body of the motor, and a tiller for steering.
This type of motor is typically used:
 to power small craft such as jon boats, dinghies, canoes, etc.
 to provide auxiliary power for sailboats
 for trolling aboard larger craft, as small outboards are typically more efficient at trolling speeds. In this application, the motor is frequently installed on the transom alongside and connected to the primary outboard to enable helm steering. In addition many small motor manufacturers have begun offering variants with power trim/tilt and electric starting functions so that they may be completely controlled remotely.

Electric-powered
Electric outboard motors are self-contained propulsory units for boats, first invented in 1973 by Morton Ray of Ray Electric Outboards. These are not to be confused with trolling motors, which are not designed as a primary source of power. Most electric outboard motors have 0.5 to 4 kW direct current (DC) electric motors, operated at 12 to 60 volts DC. Recently developed outboard motors are powered with an alternating current (AC) or DC electric motor in the power head like a conventional petrol engine. With this setup, a motor can produce 10 kW output or more and is able to replace a petrol engine of 15 HP or more. The advantage of the induction or asynchronous motor is the power transfer to the rotor by means of electromagnetic induction. As these engines do not use permanent magnets, they require less maintenance and develop more torque at lower RPM.

Pump-jet
Pump-jet propulsion is available as an option on most outboard motors. Although less efficient than an open propeller, they are particularly useful in applications where the ability to operate in very shallow water is important. They also eliminate the laceration dangers of an open propeller.

Propane 
Propane outboard motors are available from several manufacturers. These products have several advantages such as lower emissions, absence of ethanol-related issues, and no need for choke once the system is pressurized. Lehr is regarded as the first manufacturer to have brought a propane-powered outboard motor to market by Popular Mechanics and other boating publications.

History and developments
The first known outboard motor was a small 5 kilogram (11 lb) electric unit designed around 1870 by Gustave Trouvé, and patented in May 1880 (Patent N° 136,560).  Later about 25 petrol powered outboards may have been produced in 1896 by American Motors Co—but neither of these two pioneering efforts appear to have had much impact.

The Waterman outboard engine appears to be the first gasoline-powered outboard offered for sale in significant numbers. It was developed from 1903 in Grosse Ile, Michigan, with a patent application filed in 1905 Starting in 1906, the company went on to make thousands of his "Porto-Motor" units, claiming 25,000 sales by 1914.  The inboard boat motor firm of Caille Motor Company of Detroit were instrumental in making the cylinder and engines.

The most successful early outboard motor, was created by Norwegian-American inventor Ole Evinrude in 1909. Historically, a majority of outboards have been two-stroke powerheads fitted with a carburetor due to the design's inherent simplicity, reliability, low cost and light weight. Drawbacks include increased pollution, due to the high volume of unburned gasoline and oil in their exhaust, and louder noise.

Four stroke outboards
Although four stroke outboards have been sold since the late 1920s, particularly Roness and Sharland, in 1962 Homelite introduced a commercially viable four cycle outboard a 55-horsepower motor, based on the 4 cylinder Crosley automobile engine. This was called the Bearcat and was later purchased by Fischer-Pierce, the makers of Boston Whaler, for use in their boats because of their advantages over two strokes. In 1964, Honda Motor Co. introduced its first four-stroke powerhead.  In 1984, Yamaha introduced their first four-stroke powerhead. These motors were only available in the smaller horsepower range. In 1990 Honda released 35 hp and 45 hp four-stroke models. They continued to lead in the development of four-stroke engines throughout the 1990s as US and European exhaust emissions regulations such as CARB (California Air Resources Board) led to the proliferation of four-stroke outboards. At first, North American manufacturers such as Mercury and OMC used engine technology from Japanese manufacturers such as Yamaha and Suzuki until they were able to develop their own four-stroke engine. The inherent advantages of four-stroke motors included: lower pollution (especially oil in the water), noise reduction, increase fuel economy, and increased low rpm torque.

Honda Marine Group, Mercury Marine, Mercury Racing, Nissan Marine, Suzuki Marine, Tohatsu Outboards, Yamaha Marine, and China Oshen-Hyfong marine have all developed new four-stroke engines. Some are carburetted, usually the smaller engines. The balance are electronically fuel-injected. Depending on the manufacturer, newer engines benefit from advanced technology such as multiple valves per cylinder, variable camshaft timing (Honda's VTEC), boosted low end torque (Honda's BLAST), 3-way cooling systems, and closed loop fuel injection. Mercury Verado four-strokes are unique in that they are supercharged.

Mercury Marine, Mercury Racing, Tohatsu, Yamaha Marine, Nissan and Evinrude each developed computer-controlled direct-injected two-stroke engines. Each brand boasts a different method of DI.

Fuel economy on both direct injected and four-stroke outboards measures from a 10 percent to 80 percent improvement, compared with conventional two-strokes. Depending on rpm and load at cruising speeds, figure on about a 30 percent mileage improvement.

However, the gap between two-stroke and four-stroke outboard fuel economy is beginning to narrow. Two-stroke outboard motor manufacturers have recently introduced new technologies that help to improve two-stroke fuel economy.

LPG outboards 
In 2012, Lehr inc. introduced some small (<5 hp) outboards based on modified Chinese petrol engines to run on propane gas. Tohatsu currently also produces propane powered models, all rated 5 hp. Conversion of larger outboards to run on Liquified petroleum gas is considered unusual and exotic although some hobbyists continue to experiment.

Outboard motor selection
It is important to select a motor that is a good match for the hull in terms of power and shaft length.

Power requirements
Overpowering is a dangerous condition that can lead to the transom accelerating past the rest of the vessel and underpowering often results in a boat that is incapable of performing in the role for which it was designed. Boats built in the US have a Coast Guard Rating Plate, which specifies the maximum recommended horsepower for the hull. A motor with less than 75% of the maximum will most likely result in unsatisfactory performance.
In the united kingdom, boats will have a CE plate on the transom which specifies max HP, shaft length, max engine weight and no of max persons/luggage

Shaft length
Outboard motor shaft lengths are standardized to fit 15-inch, 20-inch and 25-inch transoms. If the shaft is too long it will extend farther into the water than necessary creating drag, which will impair performance and fuel economy. If the shaft is too short, the motor will be prone to ventilation. Even worse, if the water intake ports on the lower unit are not sufficiently submerged, engine overheating is likely, which can result in severe damage.

General dimensions
Different outboard engine brands require different transom dimensions and sizes, that affects performance and trim.

Operational issues

Motor mounting height
Motor height on the transom is an important factor in achieving optimal performance. The motor should be as high as possible without ventilating or loss of water pressure. This minimizes the effect of hydrodynamic drag while underway, allowing for greater speed. Generally, the antiventilation plate should be about the same height as, or up to two inches higher than, the keel, with the motor in neutral trim.

Trim
Trim is the angle of the motor in relation to the hull, as illustrated below. The ideal trim angle is the one in which the boat rides level, with most of the hull on the surface instead of plowing through the water.

If the motor is trimmed out too far, the bow will ride too high in the water. With too little trim, the bow rides too low. The optimal trim setting will vary depending on many factors including speed, hull design, weight and balance, and conditions on the water (wind and waves). Many large outboards are equipped with power trim, an electric motor on the mounting bracket, with a switch at the helm that enables the operator to adjust the trim angle on the fly. In this case, the motor should be trimmed fully in to start, and trimmed out (with an eye on the tachometer) as the boat gains momentum, until it reaches the point just before ventilation begins or further trim adjustment results in an RPM increase with no increase in speed. Motors not equipped with power trim are manually adjustable using a pin called a topper tilt lock.

Ventilation
Ventilation is a phenomenon that occurs when surface air or exhaust gas (in the case of motors equipped with through-hub exhaust) is drawn into the spinning propeller blades. With the propeller pushing mostly air instead of water, the load on the engine is greatly reduced, causing the engine to race and the propeller to spin fast enough to result in cavitation, at which point little thrust is generated at all. The condition continues until the prop slows enough for the air bubbles to rise to the surface.  The primary causes of ventilation are:  motor mounted too high, motor trimmed out excessively, damage to the antiventilation plate, damage to propeller, foreign object lodged in the diffuser ring.

Safety
If the helmsman goes overboard, the boat may continue under power but uncontrolled, risking serious or fatal injuries to the helmsman and others in the water. A safety measure is a "kill cord" attached to the boat and helmsman, which cuts the motor if the helmsman falls overboard.

Cooling system

The most common type of cooling used on outboards of all eras use a rubber impeller to pump water from below the waterline up into the engine. This design has remained the standard due mainly to the efficiency and simplicity of its design. One disadvantage to this system is that if the impeller is run dry for a length of time (such as leaving the engine running when pulling the boat out of the water or in some cases tilting the engine out of the water while running), the impeller is likely to be ruined in the process.

Air cooled outboards
Air cooled outboard engines are currently produced by some manufacturers, these tend to be small engines of less than 5 horsepower. Outboard engines made by Briggs & Stratton are air-cooled

Closed loop cooling
Outboards manufactured by Seven Marine use a closed-loop cooling system with heat exchanger. This means saltwater is not pumped through the engine block as is the case with most outboards but still has to be pumped through the heat exchanger

Engine Stalls

An outboard engine may stall if it does not have the correct inputs. Common problems that lead to stalling are electrical issues, low quality gas or clogged fuel filer. Other issues may include a damaged carburetor oil switch.

Other outboard motoring method

In Vietnam and other parts of southeast Asia a long-tailed motor design is used. In Vietnam these are called "May Duoi Tom" (Shrimp Tail Motor). The outboard motors, which can be smallish air-cooled or water-cooled gasoline, diesel or even modified automotive engines, are bolted to a welded steel tube frame, with another long steel tube up to 3 m long to hold the drive shaft, driving a conventional looking propeller. The frame that holds the motor has a short, swiveling steel pin/tube approximately 15 cm long underneath, to be inserted into a corresponding hole on the transom, or a solid block or wood purposely built-in thereof.
This drop-in arrangement enables extremely quick transfer of the motor to another boat or for storage - all that is needed is to lift it out. The pivoting design allows the outboard motor to be swiveled by the operator in almost all directions: Sideways for direction, up and down to change the thrust line according to speed or bow lift, elevate completely out of water for easy starting, placing the drive shaft and the propeller forward along the side of the boat for reverse, or put them inside the boat for propeller replacement, which can be a regular occurrence to the cheap cast aluminum propellers on the often debris-prone inland waterways. This design is utilized to propel long-tail boats.

Manufacturers
 Aquawatt Electric Outboard Motor
 Bolinder
 Briggs & Stratton - USA - Up to 5 hp
 Cimco Marine AB
 DBD Marine
 EP Carry
 ePropulsion - Hong Kong
 Halmarine Outboards
 Hidea - China
 Honda Marine Group - Japan - Up to 250 hp
 KARVIN motors - electric outboard see KARVIN website
 Kohler Company
 Jarvis Marine
 Lehr
 Maxus outboards
 Mud-skipper Longtail outboard
 McCulloch
 Mercury/Mariner/Mercury Racing - USA - Up to 600 hp
 Nissan Marine (now Tohatsu)
 Oshen-Hyfong Marine
 Photon Marine Electric Outboard Motors for Commercial Boat Fleets see Photon Marine website
 Propel part of Saietta Group - Electric outboards
Parsun - China
 Selva Marine - Italy - Up to 250 hp
 Suzuki Marine - Japan - Up to 350 hp
 Tohatsu - Japan
 Tomos
 Torqeedo part of Deutz AG - Electric outboards
 Zomair
 Ul'yanovsk Motor Plant
 West Bend
 Yamaha Outboards - Japan - Up to 425 hp
 Yanmar Diesel

Former manufacturers
 British Anzani
 British Seagull (defunct)
 Chrysler
 Homelite
 Johnson Outboards (folded into Evinrude Outboard Motors)
 ELTO
 Evinrude, a division of Bombardier Recreational Products - USA - Up to 300 hp
 Seven Marine - USA - 3 models rated up to 627 hp utilising a General Motors sourced V8 supercharged power-plant
 Volvo Penta
 Oliver

See also

References

External links

 [https://books.google.com/books?id=ayEDAAAAMBAJ&dq=popular+science+1951+the+heart+of+a+modern&pg=RA1-PA15  "How A Kicker Works, June 1951, Popular Science] by George W. Waltz Jr - basic article on outboard motors with many drawings and illustrations
 The Antique Outboard Motor Club International
 The Super-Elto Outboard Motor (1927) Smithsonian Institution Libraries
 Early Outboard Motor Boat Racing in British Columbia
Yamaha Outboards Resources Collection

Patents
  - Marine propulsion mechanism
  - Canoe and other small craft

Marine propulsion
Marine engines